Luxembourg participated at the 2017 Summer Universiade which was held in Taipei, Taiwan.

Luxembourg sent a delegation consisting of only 3 competitors for the event competing in a single sporting event. Luxembourg didn't claim any medals at the multi-sport event.

Participants

References 

2017 in Luxembourgian sport
Nations at the 2017 Summer Universiade